12P/Pons–Brooks is a periodic comet with an orbital period of 71 years. It fits the classical definition of a Halley-type comet with (20 years < period < 200 years). Comet Pons-Brooks was discovered at Marseilles Observatory in July 1812 by Jean-Louis Pons, and then later recovered in 1883 by William Robert Brooks.

The next perihelion passage is 21 April 2024, with closest approach to Earth being  on 2 June 2024. The comet nucleus is estimated to be around 30 km in diameter assuming it was not producing too much dust and gas during the 2020 photometry.

12P/Pons–Brooks may be the parent body of the December κ-Draconids meteor shower.

Observational history

Before 1812 
Comet 12P/Pons-Brooks has been identified as a comet observed in 1385 and in 1457. The 1385 apparition was very favourable and the comet was recorded by the Chinese in Ming Shilu and was also mentioned in some European sources. A comet observed by Paolo dal Pozzo Toscanelli in January 1457 and also mentioned in Chinese sources is also indentified as comet 12P/Pons-Brooks. In both apparitions the comet had a magnitude of 3 or brighter, not accounting for possible outbursts. It is possible that it was also a comet recorded in Chinese sources in September 245 CE.

The comet has been suggested by So-Yeon Park and Jong-Chul Chae that was also the comets recorded in Asian sources in 1313 and 1668. However, Meyer et al argue that in the 1313 apparition, the comet would have been difficult to observe, being dim and close to the Sun, while the suggested position in Gemini contradicts the calculated location of comet Pons-Brooks in Aries. The March 1668 comet described by Koreans is probably the bright sungrazing comet observed by Europeans, whose orbit is no way compatible with that of comet 12P/Pons-Brooks.

Discovery 

Comet 12P/Pons–Brooks was discovered on July 12, 1812, by Jean-Louis Pons. Independently, this comet was later found by Vincent Wisniewski on August 1, and Alexis Bouvard on August 2 the same year. The comet was spotted with the naked eye on 13 August and by the end of the month a tail measuring 2 degrees in length was reported. Shortly after its initial discovery it was found to have an orbital period of about 70 years with an error of about 5 years. Johann Franz Encke determined a definitive orbit with a period of 70.68 years. This orbit was used to generate an ephemeris for the 1883-4 return.

In 2 September 1883 a (faint) comet was accidentally discovered by William Robert Brooks and later identified with the comet of 1812. The comet became visible with naked eye in 20 November and brighted up to a magnitude of 3. The comet was reported to experience outbursts on January 1 and January 19. This year it traveled from Scheat and Markab in western Pegasus, 13 January 1884; southward (through Pisces) to reach perihelion below Iota and Beta Ceti (~RA 0h, Dec. -10°) around 24 January. It was last seen in June 1884.

After 1884 
The comet was recovered on 20 June 1953. During March 1954 the comet experienced an outburst. On April 23, the comet had an estimated magnitude of 6.4 and its tail was half a degree long. Pons–Brooks came to perihelion on May 22, 1954 when it was 1.7 AU from Earth. After perihelion it became better visible from the south hemisphere. It was last observed on 4 September 1954.

Orbit 

Libration is locked at a 6:1 resonance with Jupiter. The Tisserand invariant with respect to Jupiter (J) is 0.60.

With a steep orbital inclination of 74.2° this comet does not spend a lot of time near the ecliptic. The Jet Propulsion Laboratory's (JPL) website shows that between the years 1900 and 2200, that the comet was and will be most significantly perturbed by Saturn on July 29, 1957. At that point it passed within 1.6AU of the giant planet's influence; even this approach had negligible effect. The comet's orbit appears to be stable between 1740 and 2167, with no strong perturbations by any of the planets. 

Kirkwood in 1884 noticed that Pons-Brooks shares elements with De Vico's comet of 1846. He suggested that the latter had calved off Pons-Brooks some centuries prior. Later he identified the two comets' capture into their elliptical orbits (or their parent body's capture) with their shared aphelion close to Neptune 991 CE. 

Other comets with a similar orbital period include 13P/Olbers, 23P/Brorsen-Metcalf, and 1P/Halley.

Meteor showers 
12P/Pons–Brooks is possibly the parent body of the December κ-Draconids meteor shower. This the most abundant of the meteor showers predicted to be related to the comet. One more nighttime meteor shower has been tentatively associated with 12P/Pons–Brooks, the northern June Aquilids, although most probably isn't the parent body. Comet Pons–Brooks could also create a meteor shower complex in Venus along with periodic comets 122P/de Vico and 27P/Crommelin.

Notes

References 
 

Sources

External links 
 1954 apparition lightcurve – Maik Meyer
 Comet 12P/Pons-Brooks light curve (Dmitry Chestnov)
 

Periodic comets
Halley-type comets
0012
012P
18120712